Bishop Jerome Nagar (BJN) is one of the largest shopping complexes in the city of Kollam in the Indian state of Kerala. It is owned by the Roman Catholic Diocese of Quilon, the first Catholic Diocese in India. Bishop Jerome Nagar is one of the main centres for shopping and related activities in Kollam city. A three screen multiplex, run by G-Max Cinemas, is also there at Bishop Jerome Nagar.

Features
 Seven floors (six plus parking)
 Escalator
 Valet Parking

References

Buildings and structures in Kollam
Tourist attractions in Kollam
Retail markets in Kollam
1987 establishments in Kerala
Shopping malls established in 1987
20th-century architecture in India